Arm in Arm Down the Street is a 1956 Mexican romantic drama film directed by Juan Bustillo Oro, based on a play by Armando Mook. It stars Marga López, Manuel Fábregas, and Carlos Ortigoza.

References

External links
 

1956 films
1950s Spanish-language films
Films directed by Juan Bustillo Oro
1956 romantic drama films
Mexican romantic drama films
1950s Mexican films
Mexican black-and-white films